Tři vejce do skla  (Three Eggs in a Glass) is a Czech comedy film directed by Martin Frič. It was released in 1937...Vincenc Babočka, a meaningless employee of police station, thinks he is a detective with exceptional abilities. Holiday in Karlovy Vary gives him an opportunity to prove to everyone what he is really worth. He is mistakenly considered to be international and police prosecuted adventurer Leon Weber. He decides to take advantage of the confusion and tries to find Leon's accomplice that are getting ready to steal diamonds belonging to Maharaja of Yohir. According to Weber plan, he meets Maharaja in disguise for Prince Narishkin. Everything is going according to the plan until the real Weber appears...

Cast
 Vlasta Burian as Vincenc Babočka / Leon Weber / Prince Narishkin
 Antonín Novotný (actor) as Van Houden
 Helena Bušová as Sandra, secretary
 Míla Reymonová as Jiřina, Weber's lover
 Bohuš Záhorský as Alois, accomplice of Weber
 Rudolf Kadlec as Yohir, false maharaja
 Karel Dostál as the secretary of the false maharaja
 Jaroslav Marvan as a doctor
 Theodor Pištěk as a police commissioner
 Čeněk Šlégl as a client of Babočka

References

External links
 

1937 films
1930s Czech-language films
Czechoslovak black-and-white films
Films directed by Martin Frič
Czech crime comedy films
Czechoslovak crime comedy films
1930s crime comedy films
1937 comedy films
1930s Czech films